Grabben i graven bredvid is a 2002 Swedish film directed by Kjell Sundvall.

Cast
 Elisabet Carlsson as Desirée Wallin
 Michael Nyqvist as Benny Söderström
 Annika Olsson as Märta
 Anna Azcarate as Lilian
 Rolf Degerlund as Bengt-Göran
 Anita Heikkilä as Violet

External links
 
 

Swedish romantic drama films
2002 films
2000s Swedish films